Deng Shirú (Teng Shih-ju, traditional: 鄧石如, simplified: 邓石如); c. 1739/1743–1805 was a Chinese calligrapher during the Qing Dynasty (1644–1912). 

Deng was born in Huaining 懷寧 in the Anhui 安徽 province. His style name was 'Wanbo' 顽伯 and his sobriquets were 'Wanbai shanren 皖白山人, Wan bai 完白, Guhuan, Gu wanzi 故浣子, Youji daoren 游笈道人, Fengshui yuzhang 鳳水漁長, and Longshan qiaozhang 龍山樵長'. Deng studied at the Shen Chun Academy. He later learned the art of Seal cutting.

References

External links

1739 births
1805 deaths
Artists from Anhui
People from Huaining County
18th-century Chinese painters
19th-century Chinese painters